Tuseh Rud (also Romanized as Tūseh Rūd; also known as Tūsīrū) is a village in Rostamabad-e Shomali Rural District, in the Central District of Rudbar County, Gilan Province, Iran. At the 2006 census, its population was 97.

References 

Populated places in Rudbar County